Gryaznov (from грязь meaning mud) is a Russian masculine surname, its feminine counterpart is Gryaznova. It may refer to
George (Gryaznov) (1934–2011), Russian Orthodox archbishop
Vadim Gryaznov (born 1986), Russian football player
Vyacheslav Gryaznov (born 1982), Russian classical pianist, transcriber and composer

Russian-language surnames